KESP (970 AM) is an all-sports radio station in Modesto, California, United States. The station serves Modesto, Stockton, Lodi, and surrounding communities of the northern San Joaquin Valley. It is currently owned by Cumulus Media.  Its studios are in Stockton, and its transmitter is located in Modesto.

KESP is the flagship station of the Modesto Nuts of the Low-A West baseball league, and the flagship station of Pacific Tigers college basketball team. It is also a member of the Oakland Athletics, San Francisco 49ers, San Jose Sharks, Golden State Warriors, and California Golden Bears radio networks.  Most of its daily programming, as the call letters imply, came from ESPN Radio, until January 2, 2013, when KESP switched to CBS Sports Radio.

KESP gained its current call sign, and format, in the early 2000s.  Other call signs used since it came on the air in 1951 were:  KBOX (1951–1956), KBEE (1956–1983), KHYV (1983–1988), KOOK (1988–1992(?)/1996(?)), KBUL (1996–1998), and KANM (1998–2000).

The station was owned by the McClatchy family, which also owned McClatchy Newspapers, publisher of the Modesto Bee.  (The McClatchy Company has since sold the station to Citadel Broadcasting, which merged with Cumulus Media on September 16, 2011.)

In a sports-related note, Kevin McClatchy, a member of the publishing family, owned the Pittsburgh Pirates until the team was sold to Robert Nutting in 2007.

Previous Logos

References

External links
FCC History Cards for KESP
Official site

ESP
Mass media in Stanislaus County, California
CBS Sports Radio stations
ESPN Radio stations
Cumulus Media radio stations
Radio stations established in 1951
1951 establishments in California